Joshua Alexander McKay (born 10 October 1997) is a New Zealand rugby union player. He plays for Glasgow Warriors in the United Rugby Championship. His playing position is wing or fullback.

Rugby Union career

Professional career

In February 2021, McKay was announced as joining the Glasgow Warriors in Scotland ahead of the 2021–22 season. McKay said of the move:
I like attacking with the ball in hand, I’m a balanced rugby player and I think I can make an impact on both attack and defence. I really think the style of Glasgow’s play will suit me. I’ve watched Glasgow Warriors games on TV and I’m very excited for my first taste of northern hemisphere footy. I can’t wait to run out at Scotstoun in a Warriors jersey for the first time.

McKay made his competitive debut for the Warriors on 4 December 2021 in a match against the Dragons at Scotstoun Stadium. He became Glasgow Warrior No. 338. The Glasgow side won the match in a bonus point victory.

External links 
itsrugby.co.uk Profile

References 

New Zealand rugby union players
1997 births
Living people
Rugby union wings
Rugby union fullbacks
Canterbury rugby union players
Highlanders (rugby union) players
Crusaders (rugby union) players
Glasgow Warriors players
Rugby union players from Christchurch